The Holy Week in Valladolid is one of the main tourist attractions, and cultural and religious events of Valladolid and the surrounding province during Holy Week in Spain. It boasts of renowned polychrome sculptures, created mainly by sculptors such as Juan de Juni and Gregorio Fernández, who were active when the city served as the imperial court. The city's National Sculpture Museum has a total of 42 images (distributed in the corresponding pasos) for the processions. The Holy Week in Valladolid is known to depict the Passion with great fidelity, rigor and detail.

In addition to the artistic and catechetical (instructional) value of its religious imagery, the Week is characterized by devotion, sobriety, silence and respect for the brotherhoods and the public, and by unique acts such as the "General Procession of the Sacred Passion of the Redeemer" and "Sermon of the Seven Words" in the Plaza Mayor, which recalls the autos de fé (ritual of public penance) of the 16th century. For these reasons, this celebration was declared a festival of international tourist interest in 1980 (the first Holy Week celebration in Spain to have such a designation), and in 2014 work began to have it recognized as a representation of intangible cultural heritage by UNESCO.

Brotherhoods
The city's twenty brotherhoods (five were historical and the rest were created beginning in 1920) have a total of fifty-nine different pasos, which are described by the brotherhood that owns each of them, and hold a total of thirty-three floats (processions)  as well as the "Proclamation" and the "Sermon of the Seven Words".

Processions
The processions begin the Friday before Good Friday and continue until the Sunday of Resurrection. Hundreds of penitents or cofrades take part in the parades, carrying the pasos or walking the old streets of the city with crosses, flags or candles. Thousands of people, including locals and visitors attend the events. The silence is only interrupted by the sound of drums and trumpets. The pasos are the core of the festival. They consist of a wooden sculpture, or group of sculptures, that narrates a scene from the Passion of Christ. They are carried by porters, who are members of the brotherhoods, on a platform or staves. The processions are organized by hermandades and cofradías (religious brotherhoods). Members precede the pasos dressed in penitential robes with capirotes, (tall, pointed hoods with eye-holes). The capirotes were designed so the faithful could repent in anonymity, without being recognised as self-confessed sinners. Each brotherhood has its own distinct colors, reflected in its members' costumes, that distinguish them from other brotherhoods.

The Archbishopric of Valladolid, carefully following the liturgy, has been considering the day of the Holy Saturday as non-liturgical, and therefore, not suitable for holding processions. Based on this consideration, only a procession of Solitude is held in the morning, with absence of any adornment to the image of Nuestra Señora de las Angustias. The transfer of the Recumbent Christ is held in the afternoon and closes the Passion. Visitors are still waiting for the Resurrection. Special importance is then offer to the Blessed Virgin, a penitential act that is celebrated in the church of Vera Cruz.

The Days of Holy Week 
During the Friday and Saturday of Passion Week and into Holy Week itself, the following brotherhoods make their penitential processions in Valladolid, by the order of precedence of their entry into the main church and by the date of their founding.

Friday of Sorrows
 Cofradía del Santo Entierro (Brotherhood of the Holy Burial). 1930.
 Cofradía de la Exaltación de la Santa Cruz y Nuestra Señora de los Dolores (Brotherhood of the Exaltation of the Holy Cross and our Lady of Sorrows). 1944.

Passion Saturday 
 Cofradía Penitencial de la Sagrada Pasión de Cristo (Penitential Procession of the Sacred Passion of Christ). 1531.

Palm Sunday 
 Cofradía Penitencial de la Santa Vera Cruz  (Penitential Confraternity of the Holy Vera Cruz). 1498.

Holy Monday 
 Cofradía Penitencial de la Santa Vera Cruz  (Penitential Confraternity of the Holy Vera Cruz). 1498.
 Venerable Cofradía de la Preciosísima Sangre de Nuestro Señor Jesucristo (Venerable Confraternity of the Precious Blood of our Lord Jesus Christ). 1929.
 Cofradía de las Siete Palabras (Brotherhood of the Seven Words). 1929. 
 Hermandad Penitencial de Nuestro Padre Jesús atado a la Columna (Penitential Brotherhood of Our Father Jesus tied to the Column). 1930.
 Cofradía Penitencial de La Oración del Huerto y San Pascual Bailón (Brotherhood of the penitential prayer in Gethsemane and of Saint Pascual Bailon). 1939.
 Cofradía Penitencial del Santísimo Cristo Despojado, Cristo Camino del Calvario y Nuestra Señora de la Amargura. (Penitential Confraternity of the Blessed Christ stripped, Christ on the road to Calvary, and Our Lady of the Bitterness). 1943.
 Hermandad del Santo Cristo de los Artilleros (Brotherhood of the Holy Christ of the artillerymen). 1944.
 Cofradía del Discípulo Amado y Jesús de Medinaceli (Brotherhood of the Beloved Disciple and Jesus of Medinaceli). 2011. One of the newest to be formed, and the youngest brotherhood.

Holy Tuesday 
 Ilustre Cofradía Penitencial de Nuestra Señora de las Angustias (Illustrious Penitential Brotherhood of Our Lady of Anguish). 1536.
 Hermandad Penitencial de Nuestro Padre Jesús atado a la Columna (Penitential Brotherhood of Our Father Jesus tied to the Column). 1930.
 Cofradía Penitencial del Santísimo Cristo Despojado, Cristo Camino del Calvario y Nuestra Señora de la Amargura. (Penitential Confraternity of the Blessed Christ stripped, Christ on the road to Calvary, and Our Lady of the Bitterness). 1943.

Holy Wednesday 
 Cofradía de Nuestra Señora de la Piedad (Confraternity of Our Lady of Mercy). 1578.
 Cofradía Penitencial de Nuestro Padre Jesús Nazareno (Penitential Confraternity of Our Father Jesus of Nazareth). 1596.
 Cofradía de las Siete Palabras (Brotherhood of the Seven Words). 1929. 
 Cofradía Penitencial y Sacramental de la Sagrada Cena (Sacramental and penitential Confraternity of the Holy Supper). 1940.
 Cofradía del Santo Sepulcro y Santísimo Cristo del Consuelo  (''Brotherhood of the Holy Sepulchre and Great Holy Christ of the Comfort). 1945.
 Cofradía de Nuestro Padre Jesús Resucitado y María Santísima de la Alegría  (Confraternity of Our Father The Risen Jesus and Holy Mary of Joy). 1960.

Holy Thursday 
 Cofradía de la Orden Franciscana Seglar (V.O.T.) (Brotherhood of the Secular Franciscan Order (V. O. T. )). 15th century.
 Cofradía Penitencial de la Santa Vera Cruz (Penitential Confraternity of the Holy Vera Cruz). 1498.
 Cofradía Penitencial de la Sagrada Pasión de Cristo (Penitential Procession of the Sacred Passion of Christ). 1531. 
 Cofradía de Nuestra Señora de la Piedad (Confraternity of Our Lady of Mercy). 1578.
 Cofradía Penitencial de Nuestro Padre Jesús Nazareno  (Penitential Confraternity of Our Father Jesus of Nazareth). 1596.
 Venerable Cofradía de la Preciosísima Sangre de Nuestro Señor Jesucristo (Venerable Confraternity of the Precious Blood of our Lord Jesus Christ). 1929. 
 Cofradía del Santo Entierro (Brotherhood of the Holy Burial). 1930.
 Cofradía Penitencial de La Oración del Huerto y San Pascual Bailón (Brotherhood of the penitential prayer in Gethsemane and Saint Pascual Bailon). 1939.
 Cofradía del Descendimiento y Santísimo Cristo de la Buena Muerte (Brotherhood of the descent and Holy Christ of the Good Death). 1939. 
 Cofradía Penitencial y Sacramental de la Sagrada Cena (Sacramental and penitential Confraternity of the Holy Supper). 1940.
 Hermandad Universitaria del Santo Cristo de la Luz (University Brotherhood of Santo Cristo de la Luz). 1941.
 Cofradía Penitencial del Santísimo Cristo Despojado, Cristo Camino del Calvario y Nuestra Señora de la Amargura. (Penitential Confraternity of the Blessed Christ stripped, Christ on the road to Calvary, and Our Lady of the Bitterness). 1943. 
 Cofradía de la Exaltación de la Santa Cruz y Nuestra Señora de los Dolores (Brotherhood of the Exaltation of the Holy Cross and our Lady of Sorrows). 1944.
 Cofradía de Nuestro Padre Jesús Resucitado y María Santísima de la Alegría  (Confraternity of Our Father The Risen Jesus and Holy Mary of Joy). 1960.

Good Friday 
 Cofradía de la Orden Franciscana Seglar (V.O.T.) (Brotherhood of the Secular Franciscan Order (V. O. T. )). 15th century.
 Ilustre Cofradía Penitencial de Nuestra Señora de las Angustias (''Illustrious Penitential Brotherhood of Our Lady of Anguish). 1536.
 Cofradía de las Siete Palabras (Brotherhood of the Seven Words). 1929. 
 Hermandad Universitaria del Santo Cristo de la Luz (University Brotherhood of Santo Cristo de la Luz). 1941.

Good Friday (General Procession) 
 All the brotherhoods

Holy Saturday 
 Cofradía del Santo Entierro (Brotherhood of the Holy Burial). 1930.
 Cofradía de Nuestro Padre Jesús Resucitado y María Santísima de la Alegría (Confraternity of Our Father The Risen Jesus and Holy Mary of Joy). 1960.

Easter Sunday 
 Ilustre Cofradía Penitencial de Nuestra Señora de las Angustias (Illustrious Penitential Brotherhood of Our Lady of Anguish). 1536.
 Cofradía del Santo Sepulcro y Santísimo Cristo del Consuelo (Brotherhood of the Holy Sepulchre and Great Sant Christ of Comfort). 1945.

See also 
Holy Week
Holy Week in Spain
Fiestas of International Tourist Interest of Spain

Bibliography 
 Burrieza Sánchez, Javier (2004). Cinco Siglos de Cofradías y Procesiones. Junta de Cofradías de Semana Santa de Valladolid. Depósito Legal VA. 201-2004.
Varios autores (2005). Memorias de la Pasión en Valladolid. Junta de Cofradías de Semana Santa. Depósito Legal VA. 174-2005.
Burrieza Sánchez, Javier (2005). Guía Histórico Artística de la Procesión General. Junta de Cofradías de Semana Santa. Depósito Legal VA. 809-2005.
Burrieza Sánchez, Javier (2010). Historia de una Procesión: 200 años de la General del Viernes Santo de Valladolid. Ayuntamiento de Valladolid y Junta de Cofradías de Semana Santa. Depósito Legal VA. 229-2010

References

External links 

 Holy Week in Valladolid 
 Easter Week in Valladolid 
 Holy week of Valladolid
 Easter in Valladolid
 Easter of Valladolid
 Easter Week of Valladolid
 Valladolid Cofrade  (official website of "Semana Santa de Valladolid")
 Junta de Cofradías de Semana Santa de Valladolid 
 Arzobispado de Valladolid 
 Ayuntamiento de Valladolid 
 Universidad de Valladolid 

Festivals in Spain
Valladolid
Province of Valladolid
Valladolid